Borsdorf (Sachs) station is a railway station in the municipality of Borsdorf, located in the Leipzig district in Saxony, Germany.

References

Railway stations in Saxony
Buildings and structures in Leipzig (district)